Lecil Travis Martin (September 1, 1931 – April 12, 1999), whose stage name was Boxcar Willie, was an American country music singer-songwriter, who sang in the "old-time hobo" music style, complete with overalls, and a floppy hat. "Boxcar Willie" was originally a character in a ballad he wrote, but he later adopted it as his own stage name. His early musical career was parallel to service as an enlisted flight engineer in the United States Air Force.

Biography

According to his birth record, Martin was born in Ovilla, Texas, to Birdie and Edna Mae Martin. He joined the United States Air Force in May 1949, and served as a flight engineer on the B-29 Super Fortress during the Korean War in the early 1950s. In Lincoln, Nebraska, Martin was once sitting at a railroad crossing and a fellow that closely resembled his chief boom operator, Willie Wilson, passed by sitting in a boxcar. He said, "There goes Willie." He pulled over and wrote a song entitled "Boxcar Willie". It eventually stuck and became Martin's nickname. In 1962, Martin met his future wife, Lloene, in Boise, Idaho. They later had four children.

In San Jose, California, Martin attended a talent show as "Boxcar Willie" and performed under that nickname for the first time. He won first place and a $150 prize. That was his part-time vocation, however, as he was still in the Air Force and had been flying daily missions. In the early 1970s, while assigned to the 136th Air Refueling Wing of the Texas Air National Guard, Martin served as a flight engineer aboard the Boeing KC-97 Stratofreighter and participated in Operation Creek Party. This operation provided critical in-flight refueling services for fighter aircraft assigned to the United States Air Forces in Europe for 10 years.

In 1976, Martin retired from the Air Force and became a full-time performer. One of his first national appearances was a win on Chuck Barris' The Gong Show. In the late 1970s, Martin traveled to Grand Prairie, Texas, where he purchased hundreds of 8-track tapes pre-recorded with his music to sell later in various places. After he received a contract with other recording studios, he discontinued his dealings with Cleo McDonald.

Martin entered American mainstream pop culture consciousness due to a series of television commercials for record compilations of artists who were obscure in the United States, yet had large international followings, such as Slim Whitman and Gheorghe Zamfir. Martin went on to become a star in country music. In 1981, Martin achieved a professional landmark by being inducted into the Grand Ole Opry. He also had success outside of the United States, with his 1980 album King of the Road giving him his greatest chart success by reaching No. 5 in the UK Albums Chart. Traveling around the world with Martin's band was his steadfast and trusty steel guitar player Chubby Howard, radio show host and musician for many years.

In 1985, Martin moved to Branson, Missouri, and purchased a theater on Missouri Route 76, also known as 76 Country Boulevard. In addition to the Boxcar Willie Theater, he opened a museum and eventually had two motels, both bearing his name. Martin was one of the first big stars to open a show in Branson, paving the way for the other nationally known names that followed. He performed at his theater in Branson until his death.

On February 23, 1992, Martin was featured on the second-season premier of Tracks Ahead in which he performed with his band at the Boxcar Willie Theater.

Death
Martin was diagnosed with leukemia in 1996, and died on April 12, 1999, in Branson, Missouri at the age of 67. He was buried at Ozarks Memorial Park in Branson. Major League Baseball umpire "Cowboy" Joe West was among his pallbearers.

Legacy
After a major reconstruction project, the overpass carrying Farm to Market Road 664 (locally known as Ovilla Road) over Interstate 35E in Red Oak, Texas, was renamed the Boxcar Willie Memorial Overpass. A small park, two blocks from the National Mall, near the L'Enfant Plaza station in Washington, D.C., was renamed Boxcar Willie Park. Martin is still recalled by his nickname, "America's Favorite Hobo". One of his sons, Larry Martin, has performed professionally under the stage name of Boxcar Willie Jr.

Discography

Albums

Singles

Sources
Trott, Walt (1998). "Boxcar Willie". In The Encyclopedia of Country Music. Paul Kingsbury, Editor. New York: Oxford University Press. p. 47.

References

External links
 via Wayback Machine

1931 births
1999 deaths
20th-century American male singers
20th-century American singers
American country singer-songwriters
American male singer-songwriters
Military personnel from Texas
United States Air Force officers
People from Ellis County, Texas
People from Branson, Missouri
Singer-songwriters from Texas
Singer-songwriters from Missouri
Country musicians from Texas
Country musicians from Missouri
Grand Ole Opry members
Deaths from cancer in Missouri
Deaths from leukemia